The Korea Nationalist Party (KNP) was a political party in South Korea.

History
The party was established towards the end of 1949 by a group of 71 MPs led by Yun Chi-young. In the 1950 parliamentary elections it received 9.7% of the vote and won 24 seats, emerging as the joint-largest party with the Democratic Nationalist Party. In the next elections in 1954 it was reduced to only three seats.

Yun was the KNP candidate for the vice-presidency in the 1956 elections, receiving only 2.8% of the vote. The party lost parliamentary representation in the 1958 elections

Election results

Vice President

House of Representatives

Notes

References

Defunct political parties in South Korea
1949 establishments in South Korea
1958 disestablishments in South Korea
Confucian political parties
Ilminist parties
Korean nationalist parties
Political parties disestablished in 1958
Political parties established in 1949
Three Principles of the People